This is a list of Mexican football transfers in the Mexican Primera Division during the winter 2014-15 transfer window, grouped by club. It only includes football transfers related to clubs from Liga MX, the first division of Mexican football.

Mexican Primera Division

América

In:

Out:

Atlas

In:

Out:

Chiapas

In:

Out:

Cruz Azul

In:

Out:

Guadalajara

In:

Out:

León

In:

Out:

Monterrey

In:

Out:

Morelia

In:

Out:

Pachuca

In:

Out:

Puebla

In:

Out:

Querétaro

In:

Out:

Santos Laguna

In:

Out:

Tijuana

In:

Out:

Toluca

In:

Out:

UANL

In:

Out:

UDG

In:

Out:

UNAM

In:

Out:

Veracruz

In:

Out:

See also 
 2014–15 Liga MX season

References 

Winter 2014-15
Mexico
Tran
Tran